Taekwondo at the 2019 African Games was held from 21 to 23 August 2019 in Rabat, Morocco.

The event served as a qualifier for the 2020 Summer Olympics in Tokyo, Japan.

Participating nations

Results

Men

Women

Medal table

External links 
 Taekwondo

References
 Day 1 results
 Day 2 results
 Day 3 results

2019 African Games
African Games
2019 African Games
2019